Bias is an unincorporated community in Mingo County, West Virginia, United States.

Bias most likely was named after an early settler.

References 

Unincorporated communities in West Virginia
Unincorporated communities in Mingo County, West Virginia